Bill McDowell may refer to:

Bill McDowell (ice hockey), see MJHL All-Star Teams and 1957–58 MJHL season
Bill McDowell (Australian rules footballer)

See also
William McDowell (disambiguation)